Joshua Magee (born 3 November 1994) is an Irish badminton player. He started playing badminton at the age of six in Raphoe club, and was selected to join the national team in 2014. He competed at the 2015 and 2019 European Games, and in 2015, he won a bronze medal in the men's doubles event with his brother Sam Magee.

Achievements

European Games 
Men's doubles

BWF International Challenge/Series 
Men's doubles

  BWF International Challenge tournament
  BWF International Series tournament
  BWF Future Series tournament

References

External links 
 

1994 births
Living people
Sportspeople from County Donegal
Irish male badminton players
Badminton players at the 2015 European Games
Badminton players at the 2019 European Games
European Games bronze medalists for Ireland
European Games medalists in badminton